New York's historic Putnam County Courthouse is located on Gleneida Avenue (NY 52) across from the eastern terminus of NY 301 in downtown Carmel, the county seat, overlooking Lake Gleneida. First built in 1814, two years after the county itself was established, it is the second-oldest county courthouse still in use in the state after Fulton County's.

In 1847 it was renovated extensively. At that time the Classical Revival portico and columns were added. Architect James Townsend used commercially available (although inexact) copies of the Corinthian capitals from the Monument of Lysicrates in Athens. For this and its historic importance in the county's history it was added to the National Register of Historic Places in 1976.

Building

The courthouse is a two-story, 5-by-8-bay rectangular gable-roofed frame building, with clapboard siding on the north and south sides and horizontal planks on its west (front) facade. The pedimented gable is supported by the four Corinthian columns, behind which is the main entrance, with molded classical detail. Similar ornamentation can be found on the window lintels. The two front corners have large pilasters; the original stone plinth blocks have been replaced with concrete copies and the astragals taken down to help prevent dry rot in the columns.

The stone walls of the original county jail are still visible on the south side. A two-bay east wing, added later, extends from the rear. A cupola is atop the roof.

History

After the New York state legislature divided Putnam County from Dutchess to its north in 1812, it required the creation of two courts. Trials were held in Carmel's Baptist meeting house until a courthouse could be built. After three months, one state legislator who had voted for Putnam County's creation, Robert Weeks, sold it a one-half acre (2,000 m²) lot in the middle of Carmel.

A local builder and iron miner, General James Townsend, was hired for the job. He finished it two years later for just under $4,000, using some of his locally mined ironwork, which still remains in the jail section. It opened for court on February 15, 1815.

The county grew, and by the 1840s the original courthouse could not handle its workload. Officials initially decided to build a second one in Cold Spring, at the other end of the road that became Route 301, on the Hudson River where much of the county's population was. But a deed restriction in the original land acquisition forbade the county from building its courthouse anywhere but the original land, and so the existing courthouse was renovated and expanded into today's structure. The Corinthian column capitals, popular in pattern books of the time, were likely carved in New York City and shipped to Carmel, as they were for many other buildings in the lower and mid-Hudson where similar capitals have been found.

In 1855 another jail wing was built to replace the one on the northeast corner. The county sheriff began living in the building at this time, and it became a tradition for his wife to cook food for the jail inmates. Another jail wing was built in 1907.

A fire in 1924 destroyed most of the upper story, but it was rebuilt to its original appearance. Repairs could do nothing about the building's age, however, and by the later 20th century some degradation was becoming apparent. The sheriffs and their wives moved out in 1966, and eleven years later the jail itself was closed. In December 1988, it was closed for repairs, ending 174 years of continuous use.

The repairs took six years, longer than expected, due to many problems encountered during the process. Since it reopened in 1994, it has been home to two of the county's judges and their chambers. The old jail cells have been used mainly as storage space. A newer, more modern court facility was built behind the Putnam County Office Building and opened January 2, 2008.

Although the new County Courthouse opened in 2008, the Historic Courthouse is still used for the Surrogates Court and the main courtroom is also used as the legislative chambers of the Putnam County Legislature.

See also
National Register of Historic Places listings in Putnam County, New York

References

County courthouses in New York (state)
Courthouses on the National Register of Historic Places in New York (state)
Government buildings completed in 1814
Buildings and structures in Putnam County, New York
National Register of Historic Places in Putnam County, New York